Hillary Elliott (born June 23, 1998 in London, Ontario) is a Canadian modern pentathlete. She competed at several World cups, international events, along with the 2015 Pan American Games.

References

1998 births
Living people
Canadian female modern pentathletes
Modern pentathletes at the 2015 Pan American Games
Sportspeople from London, Ontario
Pan American Games competitors for Canada
20th-century Canadian women
21st-century Canadian women